David Wakefield (born 15 January 1965) is an English former footballer who played as a midfielder in the Football League for Darlington and Torquay United and in non-league football for South Shields.

References

1965 births
Living people
Footballers from South Shields
English footballers
Association football midfielders
Darlington F.C. players
Torquay United F.C. players
South Shields F.C. (1974) players
English Football League players